Kees Tol is the name of:

Pier Tol, Kees "Pier" Tol, born 1958, Dutch retired international footballer.
Kees Tol (footballer), Dutch footballer